The Italian Democratic Liberal Party (PLDI) was a liberal and radical political party in Italy during the earlier decades of the 20th century. Initially, the party was an alliance between progressive liberals, called Liberals, Democrats and Radicals.

History
The Liberals, Democrats and Radicals' alliance was formed for the 1919 Italian general election. It came third after the Italian Socialist Party and the Italian People's Party, with 15.9% and 96 seats, doing particularly well in Piedmont and Southern Italy, especially in Sicily, the home-region of party's leader and former Prime Minister Vittorio Emanuele Orlando.

The party was formed for the 1921 Italian general election by the union of the individual politicians, most of whom had taken part to the joint electoral lists between the Italian Radical Party and the Italian Liberal Party in many single-seat constituencies of the country in 1919, gaining 16.0% of the vote and 96 seats in the Chamber of Deputies. In 1921, it gained 10.5% of the vote and 68 seats, doing particularly well in Piedmont and Southern Italy. The party suffered a strong setback in the 1924 Italian general election, which were held under strong intimidation from the fascist Blackshirts, and saw its share of votes decrease to 2.2%, electing 14 seats.

The party was banned by the Italian fascist regime on 6 November 1926, when the National Fascist Party was proclaimed to be the only legal party in Italy. After World War II, former Radicals and Democrats led by Francesco Saverio Nitti joined the National Democratic Union alongside Liberals and other elements of the old Liberal elite that governed Italy from the years of Giovanni Giolitti until the rise of Benito Mussolini and the instauration of the Fascist regime.

Ideology
The party was the expression of the liberalism and radicalism in Italy and the middle class, including cities' bourgeoisie, small business owners, and artisans among its supporters. There was also a main group of Radicals, who supported universal suffrage and universal public schooling for all children.

Electoral results

References

Defunct political parties in Italy
Defunct liberal political parties
Liberal parties in Italy
1921 establishments in Italy
Political parties established in 1921
1926 disestablishments in Italy
Political parties disestablished in 1926
Banned political parties in Italy
Radical parties in Italy